V. Saroja is an Indian politician, medical doctor, social worker and former cabinet minister of Social Welfare & Nutritious Noon meal Programme from Tamil Nadu. She was elected twice to the 12th Lok Sabha and 13th Lok Sabha from Rasipuram constituency as an All India Anna Dravida Munnetra Kazhagam candidate in 1998, and 1999 elections.

Early life and education
Dr. V. Saroja was born in Ujanur which belongs to the district of Salem in Tamil Nadu on 12 June 1948 to Shri M. Vellayan and Smt. Kandammal.

Dr. Saroja did her bachelors M.B.B.S. from Stanley Medical College and earned masters M.D. from Madras Medical College.

Political career
Dr. V. Saroja entered into the politics in 1989 and joined AIADMK. She was elected as Member of the Legislative Assembly (India) in 1991 Tamil Nadu Legislative Assembly election. In 1998, she was elected as Member of parliament for 12th Lok Sabha. In 1999, Dr. Saroja was re-elected as Member of parliament for 13th Lok Sabha. She also served as secretary of AIADMK Parliamentary Party, Lok Sabha. From 2000 to 2001 she served as the member of Committee on the Empowerment of Women. From 2000 to 2004 she served as the member of Consultative Committee, Ministry of Finance. She is also the former State Information Commissioner of Tamil Nadu.

Jayalalithaa appointed Saroja as Minister for Social Welfare and Nutritious Noon Meal Programme in May 2016. This was her first cabinet post in the Government of Tamil Nadu.
Dr. V Saroja won with highest number of votes in 2016 Rasipuram Assembly Election.

Dr. V Saroja, visited a number of countries while serving the nation as a politician. In June 2000, Dr. Saroja went to New York City, United States of America, and joined "BEIJING +5" Special Session at United Nations General Assembly as a member of Parliamentary Delegation. She also visited Australia and New Zealand as a member of Goodwill delegation of WHIPS of Political parties.

In March 2002, Dr Saroja attended 18th Asian Parliamentarians Meeting on Population and Development in Tokyo, Japan.

Positions held

Personal life
In 1975 she was married with Dr. L. Lokaranjan, having one daughter.

References 

All India Anna Dravida Munnetra Kazhagam politicians
Living people
India MPs 1998–1999
India MPs 1999–2004
Lok Sabha members from Tamil Nadu
20th-century Indian women politicians
20th-century Indian politicians
21st-century Indian women politicians
21st-century Indian politicians
People from Namakkal district
Tamil Nadu MLAs 2016–2021
1948 births
Women members of the Tamil Nadu Legislative Assembly